Leiosphaeridia is an extinct genus of algae or acritarchs. The genus of undefined species were found in outcrop Morro do Papaléo in the town of Mariana Pimentel in Brazil, the geopark Paleorrota. The outcrop date Sakmarian in Permian.

See also
 Leiosphaerid

References 

Acritarch genera
Permian life